These lists the Catholic dioceses of the Catholic Church in the United Kingdom. The Catholic Church is not organised on a state basis in the United Kingdom. In the island of Great Britain, the Church is organised into two separate hierarchies or episcopal conferences: the Catholic Church in England and Wales, and the Catholic Church in Scotland. In the island of Ireland, Northern Ireland is a constitutional part of the United Kingdom. No separate episcopal conference exists for Northern Ireland; instead, the Church is part of the hierarchy or episcopal conferences of the Catholic Church in Ireland. There are also a number of Eastern Catholic dioceses in the UK.

Latin Rite Dioceses

Latin Rite Dioceses in Great Britain

Within the island of Great Britain, the Episcopal Conference of England and Wales has five provinces, subdivided into 22 dioceses; the Episcopal Conference of Scotland has two provinces, subdivided into 8 dioceses.

Episcopal Conference of England and Wales
 Ecclesiastical province of Birmingham 
 Archdiocese of Birmingham
 Diocese of Clifton
 Diocese of Shrewsbury

 Ecclesiastical province of Cardiff (in Wales; also includes the ceremonial county of Herefordshire in England)
 Archdiocese of Cardiff
 Diocese of Menevia
 Diocese of Wrexham

 Ecclesiastical province of Liverpool 
 Archdiocese of Liverpool
 Diocese of Hallam
 Diocese of Hexham and Newcastle
 Diocese of Lancaster
 Diocese of Leeds
 Diocese of Middlesbrough
 Diocese of Salford

 Ecclesiastical province of Southwark 
 Archdiocese of Southwark
 Diocese of Arundel and Brighton
 Diocese of Plymouth
 Diocese of Portsmouth

 Ecclesiastical province of Westminster 
 Archdiocese of Westminster
 Diocese of Brentwood
 Diocese of East Anglia
 Diocese of Northampton
 Diocese of Nottingham

Episcopal Conference of Scotland
 Ecclesiastical province of Saint Andrews and Edinburgh
Archdiocese of Saint Andrews and Edinburgh
Diocese of Aberdeen
 Diocese of Argyll and the Isles
 Diocese of Dunkeld
 Diocese of Galloway

 Ecclesiastical province of Glasgow
 Archdiocese of Glasgow
 Diocese of Motherwell
 Diocese of Paisley

Latin Rite Dioceses in Northern Ireland
The Catholic dioceses located in Northern Ireland are organised together with those in the Republic of Ireland, as the Catholic Church in Ireland was not divided when civil authority in Ireland was partitioned in the 1920s. All dioceses in Northern Ireland are part of the ecclesiastical province of Armagh. This province approximates the civil province of Ulster.

 The Metropolitan Archdiocese of Armagh is the primatial see of all Ireland. Its territory is partly located in Northern Ireland and partly in the Republic of Ireland. Suffragan dioceses located wholly or partly in Northern Ireland are:
Diocese of Clogher. While the cathedra is located in the Republic, part of its territory extends into the UK.
Diocese of Derry. While the cathedra is located in the UK, part of its territory extends into the Republic.
Diocese of Kilmore. While the cathedra is located in the Republic, part of its territory extends into the UK.

The following suffragans of Armagh are located only in the Republic of Ireland; no part is their territory is located in Northern Ireland.
Diocese of Ardagh (united with the titular bishopric of Clonmacnois) 
Diocese of Meath
Diocese of Raphoe

Eastern Catholic Dioceses in Great Britain
There are two Eastern Catholic sui juris churches in Great Britain that are in communion with the Holy See:
Ukrainian Catholic Eparchy of the Holy Family of London
Syro-Malabar Catholic Eparchy of Great Britain

References

 List
United Kingdom
Catholic dioceses